Janusz Kudyba (born 12 July 1961) is a Polish football striker. He is currently a member of the board at Miedź Legnica in the economic sector.

He played in the top leagues of Poland and Norway and most recently coached the Polish 2nd division football team KS Polkowice.

References

External links
 

1961 births
Living people
Polish footballers
Polish expatriate footballers
Lyn Fotball players
Eliteserien players
Expatriate footballers in Norway
Polish expatriate sportspeople in Norway
Lech Poznań players
Motor Lublin players
Zagłębie Lubin players
GKS Bełchatów players
Śląsk Wrocław players
Polish football managers
Zagłębie Sosnowiec managers
People from Jelenia Góra
Sportspeople from Lower Silesian Voivodeship
Association football forwards